Colpotrochia is a genus of ichneumon wasps in the family Ichneumonidae. There are at least 61 described species in Exochus.

References

External links

 

Parasitic wasps
Ichneumonidae
Ichneumonidae genera